The  doubles Tournament at the 2006 Zurich Open took place between 16 October and 23 October on the indoor hard courts of the Hallenstadion in Zürich, Switzerland. Cara Black and Rennae Stubbs won the title, defeating Liezel Huber and Katarina Srebotnik in the final.

Seeds

Draw

References
 Main Draw

2006 Doubles
Zurich Open - Doubles